The Nanyang Normal University is an ordinary undergraduate college in Henan Province.
It was founded in 1951 in Nanyang Normal School of Henan Province.
 
In 1958, it was upgraded to Nanyang Normal College. In 2000, it was upgraded to Nanyang Normal University. In 2007, through the evaluation of the undergraduate teaching level of the Ministry of Education, in 2011, it was approved as the “National Special Needs Talent Training Project – the bachelor degree awarded unit to carry out the training of master's degree graduate students”. In 2016, it was identified as a demonstration application in Henan Province. The technical type of undergraduate colleges was approved in 2017 as a master's degree granting unit.

History

See also 
Expressways of Henan
China National Highways
Expressways of China
Henan
 Nanyang 
Wolong District
Wancheng District
 Nanyang Institute of Technology
 Nanyang Normal University
 Nanyang Medical College
 Henan Polytechnic Institute
 Nanyang Vocational College of Agriculture
 List of universities and colleges in Henan

References

External links
 Official website of Nanyang Normal University (Chinese)
 Official website of Nanyang Normal University (English)

Teachers colleges in China
Universities and colleges in Nanyang, Henan
Educational institutions established in 1912
1912 establishments in China